The 2009–10 Welsh Football League Division One began on 15 August 2009 and ended on 22 May 2010. Goytre United won the league by one point.

Team changes from 2008–09
West End, Ely Rangers and Garden Village were promoted from the Welsh Football League Division Two.

Cwmbran Town, Croesyceiliog and Newport YMCA were relegated to the Welsh Football League Division Two.

League table

Results

External links
 Welsh Football League

Welsh Football League Division One seasons
2009–10 in Welsh football leagues